Sosnovka is the name of several inhabited localities in Russia.

Modern localities

Altai Krai
As of 2012, six rural localities in Altai Krai bear this name:
Sosnovka, Charyshsky District, Altai Krai, a selo in Mayaksky Selsoviet of Charyshsky District; 
Sosnovka, Krasnogorsky District, Altai Krai, a selo in Ust-Kazhinsky Selsoviet of Krasnogorsky District; 
Sosnovka, Pervomaysky District, Altai Krai, a selo in Bobrovsky Selsoviet of Pervomaysky District; 
Sosnovka, Sovetsky District, Altai Krai, a selo in Shulginsky Selsoviet of Sovetsky District; 
Sosnovka, Tyumentsevsky District, Altai Krai, a settlement in Berezovsky Selsoviet of Tyumentsevsky District; 
Sosnovka, Zarinsky District, Altai Krai, a selo in Sosnovsky Selsoviet of Zarinsky District;

Amur Oblast
As of 2012, one rural locality in Amur Oblast bears this name:
Sosnovka, Amur Oblast, a selo in Sosnovsky Rural Settlement of Seryshevsky District

Arkhangelsk Oblast
As of 2012, three rural localities in Arkhangelsk Oblast bear this name:
Sosnovka, Konoshsky District, Arkhangelsk Oblast, a settlement in Glubokovsky Selsoviet of Konoshsky District
Sosnovka, Pinezhsky District, Arkhangelsk Oblast, a settlement in Sosnovsky Selsoviet of Pinezhsky District
Sosnovka, Plesetsky District, Arkhangelsk Oblast, a settlement in Sosnovsky Selsoviet of Plesetsky District

Republic of Bashkortostan
As of 2012, ten rural localities in the Republic of Bashkortostan bear this name:
Sosnovka, Aurgazinsky District, Republic of Bashkortostan, a village in Meselinsky Selsoviet of Aurgazinsky District
Sosnovka, Bakalinsky District, Republic of Bashkortostan, a village in Bakalinsky Selsoviet of Bakalinsky District
Sosnovka, Baymaksky District, Republic of Bashkortostan, a village in Zilairsky Selsoviet of Baymaksky District
Sosnovka, Belokataysky District, Republic of Bashkortostan, a village in Atarshinsky Selsoviet of Belokataysky District
Sosnovka, Beloretsky District, Republic of Bashkortostan, a selo in Sosnovsky Selsoviet of Beloretsky District
Sosnovka, Bizhbulyaksky District, Republic of Bashkortostan, a village in Kosh-Yelginsky Selsoviet of Bizhbulyaksky District
Sosnovka, Kaltasinsky District, Republic of Bashkortostan, a selo in Novokilbakhtinsky Selsoviet of Kaltasinsky District
Sosnovka, Mechetlinsky District, Republic of Bashkortostan, a village in Alegazovsky Selsoviet of Mechetlinsky District
Sosnovka, Mishkinsky District, Republic of Bashkortostan, a village in Bolshesukhoyazovsky Selsoviet of Mishkinsky District
Sosnovka, Zilairsky District, Republic of Bashkortostan, a village in Berdyashsky Selsoviet of Zilairsky District

Bryansk Oblast
As of 2012, five rural localities in Bryansk Oblast bear this name:
Sosnovka, Dubrovsky District, Bryansk Oblast, a village in Seshchinsky Rural Administrative Okrug of Dubrovsky District; 
Sosnovka, Dyatkovsky District, Bryansk Oblast, a village in Bolshezhukovsky Rural Administrative Okrug of Dyatkovsky District; 
Sosnovka, Klintsovsky District, Bryansk Oblast, a selo in Korzhovogolubovsky Rural Administrative Okrug of Klintsovsky District; 
Sosnovka, Trubchevsky District, Bryansk Oblast, a village in Seletsky Rural Administrative Okrug of Trubchevsky District; 
Sosnovka, Vygonichsky District, Bryansk Oblast, a selo in Sosnovsky Rural Administrative Okrug of Vygonichsky District;

Republic of Buryatia
As of 2012, one rural locality in the Republic of Buryatia bears this name:
Sosnovka, Republic of Buryatia, a selo in Selendumsky Selsoviet of Selenginsky District

Chelyabinsk Oblast
As of 2012, three rural localities in Chelyabinsk Oblast bear this name:
Sosnovka, Bredinsky District, Chelyabinsk Oblast, a selo in Rymniksky Selsoviet of Bredinsky District
Sosnovka, Kunashaksky District, Chelyabinsk Oblast, a village in Burinsky Selsoviet of Kunashaksky District
Sosnovka, Uvelsky District, Chelyabinsk Oblast, a village in Polovinsky Selsoviet of Uvelsky District
Sosnovka, Central District of Chelyabinsk, a village

Chuvash Republic
As of 2012, three inhabited localities in the Chuvash Republic bear this name:

Urban localities
Sosnovka, Cheboksary, Chuvash Republic, an urban-type settlement under the administrative jurisdiction of the city of republic significance of Cheboksary

Rural localities
Sosnovka, Ibresinsky District, Chuvash Republic, a village in Shirtanskoye Rural Settlement of Ibresinsky District
Sosnovka, Morgaushsky District, Chuvash Republic, a village in Alexandrovskoye Rural Settlement of Morgaushsky District

Irkutsk Oblast
As of 2012, two rural localities in Irkutsk Oblast bear this name:
Sosnovka, Chunsky District, Irkutsk Oblast, a settlement in Chunsky District
Sosnovka, Usolsky District, Irkutsk Oblast, a selo in Usolsky District

Ivanovo Oblast
As of 2012, one rural locality in Ivanovo Oblast bears this name:
Sosnovka, Ivanovo Oblast, a village in Lezhnevsky District

Kaliningrad Oblast
As of 2012, seven rural localities in Kaliningrad Oblast bear this name:
Sosnovka, Bagrationovsky District, Kaliningrad Oblast, a settlement in Pogranichny Rural Okrug of Bagrationovsky District
Sosnovka, Khrabrovsky Rural Okrug, Guryevsky District, Kaliningrad Oblast, a settlement in Khrabrovsky Rural Okrug of Guryevsky District
Sosnovka, Lugovskoy Rural Okrug, Guryevsky District, Kaliningrad Oblast, a settlement in Lugovskoy Rural Okrug of Guryevsky District
Sosnovka, Chistoprudnensky Rural Okrug, Nesterovsky District, Kaliningrad Oblast, a settlement in Chistoprudnensky Rural Okrug of Nesterovsky District
Sosnovka, Ilyushinsky Rural Okrug, Nesterovsky District, Kaliningrad Oblast, a settlement in Ilyushinsky Rural Okrug of Nesterovsky District
Sosnovka, Polessky District, Kaliningrad Oblast, a settlement in Saransky Rural Okrug of Polessky District
Sosnovka, Pravdinsky District, Kaliningrad Oblast, a settlement in Domnovsky Rural Okrug of Pravdinsky District

Kaluga Oblast
As of 2012, five rural localities in Kaluga Oblast bear this name:
Sosnovka, Babyninsky District, Kaluga Oblast, a village in Babyninsky District
Sosnovka, Meshchovsky District, Kaluga Oblast, a village in Meshchovsky District
Sosnovka, Sukhinichsky District, Kaluga Oblast, a village in Sukhinichsky District
Sosnovka, Yukhnovsky District, Kaluga Oblast, a village in Yukhnovsky District
Sosnovka, Zhizdrinsky District, Kaluga Oblast, a village in Zhizdrinsky District

Kamchatka Krai
As of 2012, one rural locality in Kamchatka Krai bears this name:
Sosnovka, Kamchatka Krai, a selo in Yelizovsky District

Republic of Karelia
As of 2012, one rural locality in the Republic of Karelia bears this name:
Sosnovka, Republic of Karelia, a selo in Medvezhyegorsky District

Kemerovo Oblast
As of 2012, three rural localities in Kemerovo Oblast bear this name:
Sosnovka, Guryevsky District, Kemerovo Oblast, a settlement in Sosnovskaya Rural Territory of Guryevsky District; 
Sosnovka, Kemerovsky District, Kemerovo Oblast, a settlement in Arsentyevskaya Rural Territory of Kemerovsky District; 
Sosnovka, Novokuznetsky District, Kemerovo Oblast, a selo in Sosnovskaya Rural Territory of Novokuznetsky District;

Khabarovsk Krai
As of 2012, one rural locality in Khabarovsk Krai bears this name:
Sosnovka, Khabarovsk Krai, a selo in Khabarovsky District

Khanty-Mansi Autonomous Okrug
As of 2012, one rural locality in Khanty-Mansi Autonomous Okrug bears this name:
Sosnovka, Khanty-Mansi Autonomous Okrug, a settlement in Beloyarsky District

Kirov Oblast
As of 2012, seven inhabited localities in Kirov Oblast bear this name:

Urban localities
Sosnovka, Vyatskopolyansky District, Kirov Oblast, a town in Vyatskopolyansky District; 

Rural localities
Sosnovka, Nagorsky District, Kirov Oblast, a village in Nagorsky Rural Okrug of Nagorsky District; 
Sosnovka, Sovetsky District, Kirov Oblast, a village in Zashizhemsky Rural Okrug of Sovetsky District; 
Sosnovka, Svechinsky District, Kirov Oblast, a settlement in Yumsky Rural Okrug of Svechinsky District; 
Sosnovka, Uninsky District, Kirov Oblast, a selo in Sosnovsky Rural Okrug of Uninsky District; 
Sosnovka, Urzhumsky District, Kirov Oblast, a village in Bolsheroysky Rural Okrug of Urzhumsky District; 
Sosnovka, Yaransky District, Kirov Oblast, a village in Znamensky Rural Okrug of Yaransky District;

Kostroma Oblast
As of 2012, four rural localities in Kostroma Oblast bear this name:
Sosnovka, Makaryevsky District, Kostroma Oblast, a village in Ust-Neyskoye Settlement of Makaryevsky District; 
Sosnovka, Mezhevskoy District, Kostroma Oblast, a village in Georgiyevskoye Settlement of Mezhevskoy District; 
Sosnovka, Oktyabrsky District, Kostroma Oblast, a village in Pokrovskoye Settlement of Oktyabrsky District; 
Sosnovka, Vokhomsky District, Kostroma Oblast, a village in Belkovskoye Settlement of Vokhomsky District;

Krasnoyarsk Krai
As of 2012, four rural localities in Krasnoyarsk Krai bear this name:
Sosnovka, Birilyussky District, Krasnoyarsk Krai, a village in Matalassky Selsoviet of Birilyussky District
Sosnovka, Mansky District, Krasnoyarsk Krai, a village in Shalinsky Selsoviet of Mansky District
Sosnovka, Nizhneingashsky District, Krasnoyarsk Krai, a settlement under the administrative jurisdiction of Pokanayevka Work Settlement in Nizhneingashsky District
Sosnovka, Uzhursky District, Krasnoyarsk Krai, a village in Kulunsky Selsoviet of Uzhursky District

Kurgan Oblast
As of 2012, three rural localities in Kurgan Oblast bear this name:
Sosnovka, Kargapolsky District, Kurgan Oblast, a selo in Sosnovsky Selsoviet of Kargapolsky District; 
Sosnovka, Kurtamyshsky District, Kurgan Oblast, a village in Kamyshinsky Selsoviet of Kurtamyshsky District; 
Sosnovka, Vargashinsky District, Kurgan Oblast, a village in Verkhnesuyersky Selsoviet of Vargashinsky District;

Kursk Oblast
As of 2012, one rural locality in Kursk Oblast bears this name:
Sosnovka, Kursk Oblast, a selo in Sosnovsky Selsoviet of Gorshechensky District

Leningrad Oblast
As of 2012, two rural localities in Leningrad Oblast bear this name:
Sosnovka, Slantsevsky District, Leningrad Oblast, a village under the administrative jurisdiction of Slantsevskoye Settlement Municipal Formation in Slantsevsky District; 
Sosnovka, Tikhvinsky District, Leningrad Oblast, a village in Gankovskoye Settlement Municipal Formation of Tikhvinsky District;

Mari El Republic
As of 2012, three rural localities in the Mari El Republic bear this name:
Sosnovka, Gornomariysky District, Mari El Republic, a village in Mikryakovsky Rural Okrug of Gornomariysky District
Sosnovka, Novotoryalsky District, Mari El Republic, a village in Pektubayevsky Rural Okrug of Novotoryalsky District
Sosnovka, Zvenigovsky District, Mari El Republic, a village in Krasnoyarsky Rural Okrug of Zvenigovsky District

Republic of Mordovia
As of 2012, four rural localities in the Republic of Mordovia bear this name:
Sosnovka, Atyuryevsky District, Republic of Mordovia, a village in Mordovsko-Kozlovsky Selsoviet of Atyuryevsky District
Sosnovka, Ichalkovsky District, Republic of Mordovia, a settlement in Tarkhanovsky Selsoviet of Ichalkovsky District
Sosnovka, Temnikovsky District, Republic of Mordovia, a village in Russko-Karayevsky Selsoviet of Temnikovsky District
Sosnovka, Zubovo-Polyansky District, Republic of Mordovia, a settlement in Sosnovsky Selsoviet of Zubovo-Polyansky District

Moscow Oblast
As of 2012, two rural localities in Moscow Oblast bear this name:
Sosnovka, Lyuberetsky District, Moscow Oblast, a village under the administrative jurisdiction of Kraskovo Suburban Settlement in Lyuberetsky District
Sosnovka, Ozyorsky District, Moscow Oblast, a selo in Klishinskoye Rural Settlement of Ozyorsky District

Murmansk Oblast
As of 2012, one rural locality in Murmansk Oblast bears this name:
Sosnovka, Murmansk Oblast, a selo in Lovozersky District

Nizhny Novgorod Oblast
As of 2012, sixteen rural localities in Nizhny Novgorod Oblast bear this name:
Sosnovka, Bor, Nizhny Novgorod Oblast, a village in Redkinsky Selsoviet under the administrative jurisdiction of the town of oblast significance of Bor
Sosnovka, Shakhunya, Nizhny Novgorod Oblast, a village in Luzhaysky Selsoviet under the administrative jurisdiction of the town of oblast significance of Shakhunya
Sosnovka, Steksovsky Selsoviet, Ardatovsky District, Nizhny Novgorod Oblast, a selo in Steksovsky Selsoviet of Ardatovsky District
Sosnovka, Ardatov, Ardatovsky District, Nizhny Novgorod Oblast, a selo under the administrative jurisdiction of Ardatov Work Settlement in Ardatovsky District
Sosnovka, Bolshemurashkinsky District, Nizhny Novgorod Oblast, a village in Grigorovsky Selsoviet of Bolshemurashkinsky District
Sosnovka, Gorodetsky District, Nizhny Novgorod Oblast, a village in Smirkinsky Selsoviet of Gorodetsky District
Sosnovka, Solovyevsky Selsoviet, Knyagininsky District, Nizhny Novgorod Oblast, a village in Solovyevsky Selsoviet of Knyagininsky District
Sosnovka, Vozrozhdensky Selsoviet, Knyagininsky District, Nizhny Novgorod Oblast, a village in Vozrozhdensky Selsoviet of Knyagininsky District
Sosnovka, Pavlovsky District, Nizhny Novgorod Oblast, a village under the administrative jurisdiction of the town of district significance of Gorbatov in Pavlovsky District
Sosnovka, Sergachsky District, Nizhny Novgorod Oblast, a selo in Andreyevsky Selsoviet of Sergachsky District
Sosnovka, Sharangsky District, Nizhny Novgorod Oblast, a settlement in Rozhentsovsky Selsoviet of Sharangsky District
Sosnovka, Spassky District, Nizhny Novgorod Oblast, a village in Vazyansky Selsoviet of Spassky District
Sosnovka, Urensky District, Nizhny Novgorod Oblast, a settlement under the administrative jurisdiction of the town of district significance of Uren in Urensky District
Sosnovka, Vadsky District, Nizhny Novgorod Oblast, a village in Lopatinsky Selsoviet of Vadsky District
Sosnovka, Vetluzhsky District, Nizhny Novgorod Oblast, a village in Turansky Selsoviet of Vetluzhsky District
Sosnovka, Voskresensky District, Nizhny Novgorod Oblast, a village in Bogorodsky Selsoviet of Voskresensky District

Novgorod Oblast
As of 2012, two rural localities in Novgorod Oblast bear this name:
Sosnovka, Novgorodsky District, Novgorod Oblast, a village in Novoselitskoye Settlement of Novgorodsky District
Sosnovka, Soletsky District, Novgorod Oblast, a village in Dubrovskoye Settlement of Soletsky District

Novosibirsk Oblast
As of 2012, two rural localities in Novosibirsk Oblast bear this name:
Sosnovka, Iskitimsky District, Novosibirsk Oblast, a selo in Iskitimsky District
Sosnovka, Novosibirsky District, Novosibirsk Oblast, a settlement in Novosibirsky District

Omsk Oblast
As of 2012, five rural localities in Omsk Oblast bear this name:
Sosnovka, Azovsky Nemetsky natsionalny District, Omsk Oblast, a selo in Sosnovsky Rural Okrug of Azovsky Nemetsky National District
Sosnovka, Gorkovsky District, Omsk Oblast, a village in Georgiyevsky Rural Okrug of Gorkovsky District
Sosnovka, Isilkulsky District, Omsk Oblast, a village in Pervotarovsky Rural Okrug of Isilkulsky District
Sosnovka, Kormilovsky District, Omsk Oblast, a village in Nekrasovsky Rural Okrug of Kormilovsky District
Sosnovka, Tavrichesky District, Omsk Oblast, a village in Priirtyshsky Rural Okrug of Tavrichesky District

Orenburg Oblast
As of 2012, two rural localities in Orenburg Oblast bear this name:
Sosnovka, Asekeyevsky District, Orenburg Oblast, a settlement in Chkalovsky Selsoviet of Asekeyevsky District
Sosnovka, Kvarkensky District, Orenburg Oblast, a selo in Urtazymsky Selsoviet of Kvarkensky District

Oryol Oblast
As of 2012, one rural locality in Oryol Oblast bears this name:
Sosnovka, Oryol Oblast, a selo in Sosnovsky Selsoviet of Livensky District

Penza Oblast
As of 2012, eight rural localities in Penza Oblast bear this name:
Sosnovka, Bashmakovsky District, Penza Oblast, a selo in Sosnovsky Selsoviet of Bashmakovsky District
Sosnovka, Bekovsky District, Penza Oblast, a selo in Sosnovsky Selsoviet of Bekovsky District
Sosnovka, Bessonovsky District, Penza Oblast, a selo in Sosnovsky Selsoviet of Bessonovsky District
Sosnovka, Kuznetsky District, Penza Oblast, a selo in Komarovsky Selsoviet of Kuznetsky District
Sosnovka, Lopatinsky District, Penza Oblast, a selo in Chardymsky Selsoviet of Lopatinsky District
Sosnovka, Narovchatsky District, Penza Oblast, a village in Bolshekirdyashevsky Selsoviet of Narovchatsky District
Sosnovka, Penzensky District, Penza Oblast, a village in Krasnopolsky Selsoviet of Penzensky District
Sosnovka, Sosnovoborsky District, Penza Oblast, a village in Shugurovsky Selsoviet of Sosnovoborsky District

Perm Krai
As of 2012, eight rural localities in Perm Krai bear this name:
Sosnovka, Asovskoye Rural Settlement, Beryozovsky District, Perm Krai, a village in Beryozovsky District
Sosnovka, Sosnovskoye Rural Settlement, Beryozovsky District, Perm Krai, a selo in Beryozovsky District
Sosnovka, Karagaysky District, Perm Krai, a village in Karagaysky District
Sosnovka, Kosinsky District, Perm Krai, a settlement in Kosinsky District
Sosnovka, Oktyabrsky District, Perm Krai, a village in Oktyabrsky District
Sosnovka, Ordinsky District, Perm Krai, a selo in Ordinsky District
Sosnovka, Uinsky District, Perm Krai, a village in Uinsky District
Sosnovka, Yelovsky District, Perm Krai, a village in Yelovsky District

Primorsky Krai
As of 2012, one rural locality in Primorsky Krai bears this name:
Sosnovka, Primorsky Krai, a selo in Spassky District

Pskov Oblast
As of 2012, four rural localities in Pskov Oblast bear this name:
Sosnovka, Loknyansky District, Pskov Oblast, a village in Loknyansky District
Sosnovka, Opochetsky District, Pskov Oblast, a village in Opochetsky District
Sosnovka, Strugo-Krasnensky District, Pskov Oblast, a village in Strugo-Krasnensky District
Sosnovka, Velikoluksky District, Pskov Oblast, a village in Velikoluksky District

Ryazan Oblast
As of 2012, two rural localities in Ryazan Oblast bear this name:
Sosnovka, Kasimovsky District, Ryazan Oblast, a settlement in Novoderevensky Rural Okrug of Kasimovsky District
Sosnovka, Korablinsky District, Ryazan Oblast, a village in Kipchakovsky Rural Okrug of Korablinsky District

Sakha Republic
As of 2012, one rural locality in the Sakha Republic bears this name:
Sosnovka, Sakha Republic, a selo under the administrative jurisdiction of the Town of Vilyuysk in Vilyuysky District

Sakhalin Oblast
As of 2012, one rural locality in Sakhalin Oblast bears this name:
Sosnovka, Sakhalin Oblast, a selo in Dolinsky District

Samara Oblast
As of 2012, four rural localities in Samara Oblast bear this name:
Sosnovka, Bezenchuksky District, Samara Oblast, a settlement in Bezenchuksky District
Sosnovka, Pokhvistnevsky District, Samara Oblast, a selo in Pokhvistnevsky District
Sosnovka, Stavropolsky District, Samara Oblast, a selo in Stavropolsky District
Sosnovka, Yelkhovsky District, Samara Oblast, a village in Yelkhovsky District

Saratov Oblast
As of 2012, five rural localities in Saratov Oblast bear this name:
Sosnovka, Atkarsky District, Saratov Oblast, a selo in Atkarsky District
Sosnovka, Baltaysky District, Saratov Oblast, a selo in Baltaysky District
Sosnovka, Krasnoarmeysky District, Saratov Oblast, a selo in Krasnoarmeysky District
Sosnovka, Marksovsky District, Saratov Oblast, a selo in Marksovsky District
Sosnovka, Saratovsky District, Saratov Oblast, a selo in Saratovsky District

Smolensk Oblast
As of 2012, three rural localities in Smolensk Oblast bear this name:
Sosnovka, Desnogorsk Urban Okrug, Smolensk Oblast, a village under the administrative jurisdiction of Desnogorsk Urban Okrug
Sosnovka, Vyazemsky District, Smolensk Oblast, a village in Tumanovskoye Rural Settlement of Vyazemsky District
Sosnovka, Yelninsky District, Smolensk Oblast, a village in Mazovskoye Rural Settlement of Yelninsky District

Sverdlovsk Oblast
As of 2012, four rural localities in Sverdlovsk Oblast bear this name:
Sosnovka, Karpinsk, Sverdlovsk Oblast, a settlement under the administrative jurisdiction of the Town of Karpinsk
Sosnovka, Irbitsky District, Sverdlovsk Oblast, a village in Irbitsky District
Sosnovka, Nevyansky District, Sverdlovsk Oblast, a village in Nevyansky District
Sosnovka, Talitsky District, Sverdlovsk Oblast, a settlement in Talitsky District

Tambov Oblast
As of 2012, three inhabited localities in Tambov Oblast bear this name:

Urban localities
Sosnovka, Sosnovsky District, Tambov Oblast, a work settlement in Sosnovsky Settlement Council in Sosnovsky District

Rural localities
Sosnovka, Kirsanovsky District, Tambov Oblast, a settlement in Maryinsky Selsoviet of Kirsanovsky District
Sosnovka, Mordovsky District, Tambov Oblast, a selo in Sosnovsky Selsoviet of Mordovsky District

Republic of Tatarstan
As of 2012, eight rural localities in the Republic of Tatarstan bear this name:
Sosnovka, Aksubayevsky District, Republic of Tatarstan, a settlement in Aksubayevsky District
Sosnovka, Aksubayevsky District, Republic of Tatarstan, a village in Aksubayevsky District
Sosnovka, Almetyevsky District, Republic of Tatarstan, a settlement in Almetyevsky District
Sosnovka, Bugulminsky District, Republic of Tatarstan, a village in Bugulminsky District
Sosnovka, Cheremshansky District, Republic of Tatarstan, a village in Cheremshansky District
Sosnovka, Kaybitsky District, Republic of Tatarstan, a village in Kaybitsky District
Sosnovka, Nurlatsky District, Republic of Tatarstan, a village in Nurlatsky District
Sosnovka, Vysokogorsky District, Republic of Tatarstan, a selo in Vysokogorsky District

Tomsk Oblast
As of 2012, one rural locality in Tomsk Oblast bears this name:
Sosnovka, Tomsk Oblast, a selo in Kargasoksky District

Tula Oblast
As of 2012, three rural localities in Tula Oblast bear this name:
Sosnovka, Aleksinsky District, Tula Oblast, a village in Bunyrevsky Rural Okrug of Aleksinsky District
Sosnovka, Chernsky District, Tula Oblast, a village in Krestovskaya Rural Administration of Chernsky District
Sosnovka, Venyovsky District, Tula Oblast, a village in Mordvessky Rural Okrug of Venyovsky District

Tuva Republic
As of 2012, one rural locality in the Tuva Republic bears this name:
Sosnovka, Tuva Republic, a selo in Durgen Sumon (rural settlement) of Tandinsky District

Tver Oblast
As of 2012, eight rural localities in Tver Oblast bear this name:
Sosnovka, Firovsky District, Tver Oblast, a settlement in Velikooktyabrskoye Rural Settlement of Firovsky District
Sosnovka, Kalyazinsky District, Tver Oblast, a village in Starobislovskoye Rural Settlement of Kalyazinsky District
Sosnovka, Likhoslavlsky District, Tver Oblast, a village in Tolmachevskoye Rural Settlement of Likhoslavlsky District
Sosnovka, Maksatikhinsky District, Tver Oblast, a village in Zarechenskoye Rural Settlement of Maksatikhinsky District
Sosnovka, Rzhevsky District, Tver Oblast, a village in Khoroshevo Rural Settlement of Rzhevsky District
Sosnovka, Selizharovsky District, Tver Oblast, a village in Dmitrovskoye Rural Settlement of Selizharovsky District
Sosnovka, Sonkovsky District, Tver Oblast, a village in Gorskoye Rural Settlement of Sonkovsky District
Sosnovka, Torzhoksky District, Tver Oblast, a village in Sukromlenskoye Rural Settlement of Torzhoksky District

Tyumen Oblast
As of 2012, four rural localities in Tyumen Oblast bear this name:
Sosnovka, Nizhnetavdinsky District, Tyumen Oblast, a village in Cherepanovsky Rural Okrug of Nizhnetavdinsky District
Sosnovka, Uporovsky District, Tyumen Oblast, a village in Nizhnemanaysky Rural Okrug of Uporovsky District
Sosnovka, Yalutorovsky District, Tyumen Oblast, a village in Pamyatninsky Rural Okrug of Yalutorovsky District
Sosnovka, Zavodoukovsky District, Tyumen Oblast, a selo in Zavodoukovsky District

Udmurt Republic
As of 2012, five rural localities in the Udmurt Republic bear this name:
Sosnovka, Alnashsky District, Udmurt Republic, a village in Azamatovsky Selsoviet of Alnashsky District
Sosnovka, Balezinsky District, Udmurt Republic, a village in Kirshonsky Selsoviet of Balezinsky District
Sosnovka, Malopurginsky District, Udmurt Republic, a village in Ilyinsky Selsoviet of Malopurginsky District
Sosnovka, Sharkansky District, Udmurt Republic, a selo in Sosnovsky Selsoviet of Sharkansky District
Sosnovka, Yarsky District, Udmurt Republic, a village in Yelovsky Selsoviet of Yarsky District

Ulyanovsk Oblast
As of 2012, four rural localities in Ulyanovsk Oblast bear this name:
Sosnovka, Karsunsky District, Ulyanovsk Oblast, a selo in Sosnovsky Rural Okrug of Karsunsky District
Sosnovka, Maynsky District, Ulyanovsk Oblast, a selo under the administrative jurisdiction of Ignatovsky Settlement Okrug in Maynsky District
Sosnovka, Nikolayevsky District, Ulyanovsk Oblast, a village in Dubrovsky Rural Okrug of Nikolayevsky District
Sosnovka, Terengulsky District, Ulyanovsk Oblast, a selo in Belogorsky Rural Okrug of Terengulsky District

Vladimir Oblast
As of 2012, two rural localities in Vladimir Oblast bear this name:
Sosnovka, Kameshkovsky District, Vladimir Oblast, a village in Kameshkovsky District
Sosnovka, Vyaznikovsky District, Vladimir Oblast, a village in Vyaznikovsky District

Volgograd Oblast
As of 2012, two rural localities in Volgograd Oblast bear this name:
Sosnovka, Kotovsky District, Volgograd Oblast, a selo in Burluksky Selsoviet of Kotovsky District
Sosnovka, Rudnyansky District, Volgograd Oblast, a selo in Sosnovsky Selsoviet of Rudnyansky District

Vologda Oblast
As of 2012, six rural localities in Vologda Oblast bear this name:
Sosnovka, Babushkinsky District, Vologda Oblast, a village in Podbolotny Selsoviet of Babushkinsky District
Sosnovka, Cherepovetsky District, Vologda Oblast, a settlement in Korotovsky Selsoviet of Cherepovetsky District
Sosnovka, Kaduysky District, Vologda Oblast, a settlement in Baranovsky Selsoviet of Kaduysky District
Sosnovka, Kharovsky District, Vologda Oblast, a village in Kharovsky Selsoviet of Kharovsky District
Sosnovka, Sheksninsky District, Vologda Oblast, a village in Yershovsky Selsoviet of Sheksninsky District
Sosnovka, Vologodsky District, Vologda Oblast, a settlement in Sosnovsky Selsoviet of Vologodsky District

Voronezh Oblast
As of 2012, one rural locality in Voronezh Oblast bears this name:
Sosnovka, Voronezh Oblast, a settlement under the administrative jurisdiction of Ertil Urban Settlement in Ertilsky District

Yaroslavl Oblast
As of 2012, four rural localities in Yaroslavl Oblast bear this name:
Sosnovka, Borisoglebsky District, Yaroslavl Oblast, a village in Vysokovsky Rural Okrug of Borisoglebsky District
Sosnovka, Danilovsky District, Yaroslavl Oblast, a village in Danilovsky Rural Okrug of Danilovsky District
Sosnovka, Kolkinsky Rural Okrug, Pervomaysky District, Yaroslavl Oblast, a village in Kolkinsky Rural Okrug of Pervomaysky District
Sosnovka, Kozsky Rural Okrug, Pervomaysky District, Yaroslavl Oblast, a village in Kozsky Rural Okrug of Pervomaysky District

Zabaykalsky Krai
As of 2012, one rural locality in Zabaykalsky Krai bears this name:
Sosnovka, Zabaykalsky Krai, a selo in Khiloksky District

Alternative names
Sosnovka, alternative name of Zelenaya Roshcha, a village in Maslinsky Selsoviet of Mishkinsky District in Kurgan Oblast; 
Sosnovka, alternative name of Sosnovo, a village in Izvarskoye Settlement Municipal Formation of Volosovsky District in Leningrad Oblast; 
Sosnovka, alternative name of Lesnoy, a settlement in Panovsky Selsoviet of Rebrikhinsky District in Altai Krai;

See also
Sosnówka (disambiguation)
Sosnivka (Sosnovka)